Charles Ream Jackson (1898–1971) was an American Marine, best known for his posthumously published memoir I Am Alive: A United States Marine's Story of Survival in a World War II Japanese POW Camp.

Biography
Charles R. Jackson was born in Petersburg, Virginia on July 14, 1898. He attended Virginia Military Institute, where he earned a degree in civil engineering.  From there he attended West Point and graduated in 1919. He then served in the United States Army, resigning his commission in 1925 to join the United States Marine Corps, where he enrolled in 1927 as a private.

While fighting in the Battle of Corregidor in the spring of 1942, he was captured by the Japanese and interned as a P.O.W. for three years.

After the war, he was appointed a commissioned warrant officer in the Marine Corps. He married Margaret MacRae on April 7, 1949.

He retired on November 1, 1951, due to eye problems caused by vitamin deficiencies he experienced as a prisoner of war.

He died in San Diego, California on May 4, 1971.

Ranks
 Private
 Sergeant major

Military medals and ribbons

Writings
Charles R. Jackson's plain account of his experiences as a P.O.W. of the Japanese was edited by military historian Major Bruce Norton USMC (Ret.) and published posthumously in June 2003.  Among other topics from Jackson's notes that were assembled were accounts of inhumanity and deadly situations, including forced marches.

Sources

References

1898 births
1971 deaths
Recipients of the Silver Star
United States Army officers
United States Marine Corps personnel of World War II
United States Marine Corps non-commissioned officers
American prisoners of war in World War II
World War II prisoners of war held by Japan
20th-century American memoirists
20th-century American male writers
Military personnel from Virginia